LayaBox ( Souyou Network Technology Beijing Co., Ltd.), also named Laya, is a Chinese-developed freeware framework which includes an HTML5 game engine named LayaAir which targets mobile and web platforms, as well as online publishing and digital distribution services. First announced on the Global Mobile Game Confederation in March 2015,  it offers a feature set for developing multi-platform games.

Currently a hundred games officially use Laya engine solutions. The LayaPublish module is available to publish games made with it to various platforms.

History 
Founded in 2014 by Xie ChengHong, LayaBox was at the start mainly focused on high-performance transcompiling flash game coded in ActionScript 3.0 to HTML5/WebGL. It has since been extended to offer more tools and features for the developers with full support for commercialization.

During the International Game Developers Conference held in November 2015, Xie ChengHong announced a new 3D engine is currently being developed. 30 June 2016, LayaAir 1.0 is published on official website, with 3D and VR support features.

Name and mascot 
The name "Layabox" was inspired from Laya village, nestled at the foot of the Himalaya. Logo's company, a shape of front primate face, referred to Yeti, which is a famous story in the region. Also, lot of monasteries may contain a sacred box which remain inside some body part of this legendary creature like scalp or fur.

Another reason would be a Chinese play on words between ape (猿) and coders (程序员), which have the same pronunciation and writing in pinyin: «yuán».

Technology and features 
The "Layabox Product Family" is a components suite solution designed to implement web/mobile game publishing, translating contents, profit monetization, 3rd party API and online distribution.

LayaFlash 
LayaFlash is source-to-source compiler that runs as a back end to the LLVM compiler, making it the most suitable for ActionScript 3.0 programmers to release on HTML5 platform. It is also fully compatible with Flash IDE such as FlashBuilder, FDT, FlashDevelop
 or LayaAir IDE.

LayaAir 
LayaAir is a dedicated open-source API for games and multimedia routines modules. It can be integrated from different ECMAScript standard language (ActionScript 3.0, JavaScript and TypeScript).
LayaAir engine use his own 3D data format file. To handle importation of assets data from 3D graphics software, LayaBox provide a tools converter from FBX files. Also, Unity plugin is available to convert "GameObject" into LayaModel files (*.lm).

The last core libraries released support:

 UI library primitives with the most common GUI elements in game scene. (both Canvas and WebGL mode support)
 2D skeletal animation by interpolation with timeline, GPU skinning for 3D.
 2D/3D particle system.
 VR view mode.
 Audio libraries and sound controller. ( wrap OpenAL for mobile and HTML5 Audio for web browser)
 Composite, blend and basic filters operation Canvas/sprite.
 Various Event-driven programming with event Bubbling and Capturing.
 Compatibility with some additional frameworks: Starling, MornUI

LayaPlayer 
Written in C and C++, LayaPlayer  (codenamed Conch) is a runtime accelerator for Android and iOS to execute HTML5 games with low memory footprint, low CPU  consumption, logic render with dual core running, GPU acceleration, video memory intelligent management and extremely optimized rendering flow with high FPS result. Supports Canvas, WebGL and DOM-type engine. HTML5 web-based applications, released with LayaPlayer, run  on mobile at near-native speeds.

It is possible to call native library function from HTML5 code.

LayaPublish 
Related to publication services, LayaPublish helps channels mainstream companies to acquire internet traffic. Available in rich web application form, it gives also an opportunity for developers to spread their game visibility in wide portal

LayaStore 
LayaStore is an embedded program which can run directly into native applications, it gives access to a full list of HTML5 APP games from LayaBox store. Introduced as a lightweight (20 Kb) add-on component to head into a monetization for developers. They can generate revenue on either a microtransaction or numbers of mobile installation basis service.

LayaOpen 
LayaOpen is a platform exchange offers revenue management and leaderboard statistics activities for developers and channels distributors. Both can get product information and feedback on User data , Social sharing / analytics and monthly active users

Distribution 
Developers Account lets users connect all of their game  product across all distribution channels platform. Mobile marketing technology is the main target audiences.

2015 

 Tencent QQ Browser - QQ空间玩吧
 Tencent Qzone - QQ浏览器
 Baidu Browser - 百度浏览器
 Cheetah Mobile Browser - 猎豹浏览器
 Sina Weibo - 新浪微博
 China Telecom - 中国电信

Reception

Games using the Laya solutions 

2015 

 Go Your Majesty 《上吧主公》
 Hunter Blade 2 《猎刃2》
 Sword master《傲剑》(by aojian趣游)
 Westward Journey Online 《醉西游》(MMORPG by 4399游戏)
 Dragon Shout 《龙吟三国》(2.5D RPG by KINGNET)
 TiānTiān LièRén《天天猎人》 (by Hagoot)
 SānGuó Zhì Luàn Guà 《三国志乱挂》(by Hagoot)
 Three Kingdoms: Hong 《轰三国》
 The Heroes Conquest 《英雄争霸》
 Gate of Warfare《战争之门》
 The Magic Card Fantacy 《魔卡幻想》
 Cute Three Kingdoms 《萌挂三国》
 The Three Kingdoms: Take the Tower 《夺塔三国》
 I Love My Family《我爱我家》
 Bear on Way《熊来啦》
 Journey to the West Rush《西游快跑》
 Hey Vixen! 《哟狐狸精》
 Mini Hunters 《迷你猎人》

Awards and recognition 

2015 Industry Contribution Award HTML5 game (2015年HTML5游戏产业贡献奖)
Best promising engine H5 prize (Layabox荣膺“2015年度最佳引擎奖”)

See also 
 Rich web application
 Mochi Media

References

External links 
 Official website
 Github LayaAir Wiki guide

Rich web applications
Video game development software
Video game engines
2014 establishments in China
Video game companies of China